The Taiwan Men's National Wheelchair Basketball Team is the wheelchair basketball side that represents Taiwan in international competitions for men as part of the International Wheelchair Basketball Federation. At 2011 Asia-Oceania Championship they finished on fourth place.

References

National men's wheelchair basketball teams
Wheelchair basketball